Anaukbaklun (21 January 1578 – 9 July 1628) was the sixth king of Taungoo Burma and was largely responsible for restoring the kingdom after it collapsed at the end of 16th century. In his 22–year reign from 1606–1628, Anaukpetlun completed the reunification efforts begun by his father, King Nyaungyan. Having inherited a partial kingdom comprising mainly Upper Burma and the Shan States from his father, Anaukpetlun went on to reconquer Lan Na in the east, and in the south, Lower Burma from rival Burmese factions and the Portuguese, as well as the Upper Tenasserim from the Ayutthaya Kingdom. The kingdom was known as the Restored Taungoo Kingdom or Nyaungyan Dynasty.

Family
Officially styled as Maha Dhamma Yaza, Anaukpetlun was a grandson of Bayinnaung. Both of his parents were children of Bayinnaung, half-brother and half-sister. In November 1605, Nyaungyan died after a military campaign to Hsenwi. Anaukpetlun then inherited the Kingdom of Ava that included all north of Bagan along the Irrawaddy River and the cis-Salween Shan States.

Anaukpetlun pursued his campaigns to unify the Burmese kingdom. In 1608, he took Prome (modern Pyay), installing his brother Thalun as the King of Prome.

In 1610 he took Taungoo from Natshinnaung and forced the king to swear loyalty. However, Filipe de Brito e Nicote, the Portuguese ruler of Syriam (modern Thanlyin) marched to Taungoo and captured Natshinnaung.

Anaukpetlun then marched the Ava armies and fleets to capture Syriam and rescued the King of Toungoo but faced Rakhine opportunistic invasions. He was able to counter the Rakhine fleets and took the port of Syriam in 1613, though Nat Shin Naung had already died. Anaukpetlun took the European-Portuguese captives to Ava and Bago, where they were known as Bayingyi and served as gunners for the Burmese armies later.

In 1617, Anaukpetlun decided to make Bago the capital of his dominions and crowned himself as King of Bago that year.

In 1613–1614, Anaukpetlun attacked Dawei, Tenasserim and Chiang Mai but was repelled.  In 1618 Siam and Burma reached an agreement in which Burma would control Mottama and Thailand would control Chiang Mai.

In 1624, Anaukpetlun sent his brother Thalun to curb the rebellion of Chiang Saen and Nan.

Anaukpetlun was murdered by shoot by the arrow on his neck at his pavillion in Nat Ywa shin's village on the west blank of Irrawaddy river by the fisherman name Shin Than Kho who's his son's boyfriend in 1628 cause by his son Minyedeippa, who had a relationship with နှင်းခမ်းပေါနှင့် (Ning Kham Paw Hnin) the daughter of Hso Hkan Hpa or Phra Moeng Sai, the Sawbwa of Kengtung one of Anaukpetlun's minor queen and feared the possible punishments. Minyedeippa held the throne for a short time before being purged by Thalun in August 1630. in Harvey reported Minyedeippa executed by Thalun in November 1630 but in the U-Kala chronicle has different story the tale in this chronicle many princess from Chiangmai supported Minyedeippa and Thalun cannot executed him, Thalun must moved the capital to Ava in 1634 because he can't controlled his powerful at Hanthawaddy the city Minyedeippa still alive there.

References

Bibliography
 
 

Rulers of Toungoo
Assassinated Burmese people
1578 births
1628 deaths
17th-century Burmese monarchs